Neythukaran is a 2002 Malayalam movie, the first directed by Priyanandanan, starring Murali. It tells the story of a weaver, a supporter of E. M. S. Namboodiripad, who dies the day after his leader dies.

Murali won the National Film Award for Best Actor in 2002 for his performance in this film.

Synopsis 
Namboodiripad, the leader of the first democratically elected Communist government is dead. (His death was on the same day as the BJP-led government came to power in the centre. This coincidence strengthened the mystic cloud around the man called EMS by his friends). Appa Mestry, a veteran Communist who lives in the nostalgia of "those great days", is unable to believe that EMS has died. For him, EMS is a great leader, whose death is unthinkable. He goes back to those ages, where they worked for the freedom struggle, risking their lives. He proudly remembers the day when he took Comrade P. Krishnapilla on his shoulder safely across the river. He remembers contemptuously the day when the first EMS ministry was dismissed by the central government as a result of unjust agitation by the religious lobbies of Kerala. He had even fasted when AK Gopalan had gone on a fast against a government decision.

Appa Mestry's next generation, his son-in-law and his friend Bahuleyan, who have discarded their extremist leftist ideology, are illustrated as frauds. (Bahuleyan no longer has a beard, which he had worn during his Communist days; he no longer uses bedis.) According to Appa Mestry, his son-in-law has done wrong by not closing his office when hearing about the death of EMS. They drive their car to get alcohol, while the whole of Kerala grieves the death of EMS by observing harthal. Appa's grandchildren are indifferent and are immersed in their own worlds. During the television coverage of the funeral procession, Appa's grandson sits watching a cricket match, completely oblivious to EMS's legacy.

Appa Mestry dies broken hearted the following day, the day of EMS's funeral.

Cast 
 Murali as Appa Mestry
 Vijayaraghavan
 M. R. Gopakumar as Bahuleyan
 Sona Nair
 Irshad
 Binesh mk
 Santha Devi
 Sreenath as Appa's grandson
 Christy Thomas as Appa's granddaughter

Awards 
 National Film Award for Best Actor - Murali
 Kerala State Film Award for Best Debut Director - Priyanandanan

References 

2000s Malayalam-language films
2002 films
Films featuring a Best Actor National Award-winning performance
2002 directorial debut films
Films directed by Priyanandanan